Mice and Men is a lost 1916 silent romance film directed by J. Searle Dawley, starring Marguerite Clark, and based on a 1903 Broadway play, Mice and Men by Madeleine Lucette Ryley.

Cast
Marguerite Clark - Peggy
Marshall Neilan - Captain George Lovell
Charles Waldron - Mark Embury
Clarence Handyside - Roger Goodlake
Maggie Fisher - Mrs. Deborrah
Helen Dahl - Joanna
Robert Conville - Minister Goodlake/Servant to Goodlake
William McKey - Embury's Servant
Ada Deaves - Matron
Francesca Warde - Mammy

References

External links
Mice and Men, IMDb.com
Mice and Men, AllMovie.com
Mice and men, a romantic comedy in four acts by Madeleine Lucette Ryley

1916 films
American silent feature films
Lost American films
American films based on plays
Paramount Pictures films
1910s romance films
American black-and-white films
American romance films
Films directed by J. Searle Dawley
1910s American films